"If You Want To Sing Out, Sing Out" is a popular song by Cat Stevens. It first appeared in the 1971 film Harold and Maude.

Stevens wrote all the songs in Harold and Maude in 1970–1971, during the time he was writing and recording his Tea for the Tillerman album. However, "If You Want to Sing Out, Sing Out"  and two other songs from that period were not released as singles nor placed on any album at that time.  No official soundtrack was released from the film at that time. The song was finally released later on Stevens' 1984 album, Footsteps in the Dark: Greatest Hits, Vol. 2 along with his other previously unreleased songs. In addition, it appeared on the UK edition of his 2003 album The Very Best of Cat Stevens.

Official soundtrack (2007)
The first official soundtrack album to the film was released in December 2007, by Vinyl Films Records, as a vinyl-only limited edition release of 2500 copies. It contained a 30-page oral history of the making of the film, the most extensive series of interviews yet conducted on Harold and Maude.

Appearances in other media
The song features prominently in Hal Ashby's Harold and Maude.

In 2007, a rendition of "Sing Out" appeared in the film Charlie Bartlett.

The song is featured in the TV shows My Name Is Earl and Ray Donovan.

It was featured as the 2nd song of Rodney Mullen's skateboarding part in the Plan B video, Questionable.

The song is also the theme to the BBC Radio sitcom North by Northamptonshire.

As of fall 2016, the song appears in a commercial for the 2017 Jeep Grand Cherokee.

Cover versions
 The song has been covered by Bloomington, Indiana's folk punk pioneers Ghost Mice under the shortened title "Sing Out".
 The song has been covered by Death By Chocolate in 2001, on their first, self-titled album
 In August 2009, Yusuf Islam approved his original recording of the song for use in a T Mobile television commercial. Wyclef Jean also made an upbeat remix of the song for a later T Mobile commercial that aired in December 2009.
 Folk music/bluegrass band Rani Arbo and Daisy Mayhem covered the song for their 2010 album Ranky Tanky.
 The song has also been covered by Amanda Palmer.
 The song has been covered by Jim Gill on his 1995 children's album Jim Gill Makes It Noisy In Boise, Idaho.
 German bitpop band Welle: Erdball covered the song on their album Der Kalte Krieg (2011).
 The song was covered by James Marsden, Ariana Greenblatt and Jacob Collier in the 2021 animated feature The Boss Baby: Family Business.

References

Cat Stevens songs
1971 songs
Songs written for films
Songs written by Cat Stevens
Song recordings produced by Paul Samwell-Smith